The ear pull is a traditional Inuit game or sport which tests the competitors' ability to endure pain, and also strength. In the ear pull, two competitors sit facing each other, their legs straddled and interlocked. A two-foot-long loop of string, similar to a thick, waxed dental floss, is looped behind their ears, connecting right ear to right ear, or left ear to left ear.  The competitors then pull upon the opposing ear using their own ear until the cord comes free or the opponent quits from the pain. The game has been omitted from some Arctic sports competitions due to safety concerns and the squeamishness of spectators; the event can cause bleeding and competitors sometimes require stitches.

The ear pull is one example of Inuit games that "prepare children for the rigors of the arctic environment by stressing... physical strength and endurance", as well as helping one keep a mental record of one's endurance levels.

References

External links
Video news report on ear pull competition at the World Eskimo Indian Olympics

Endurance games
Games of physical skill
Individual sports
Inuit games